A crab is a water-dwelling creature, a decapod crustacean of the infraorder Brachyura. A related common meaning is crab meat.

Crab may also refer to:

Other animals
 Anomura, an infraorder containing hermit crabs, king crabs, and other animals that is a sister group to the true crabs (infraorder Brachyura)
 Horseshoe crab, a chelicerate that lays its eggs on beaches and is utilized by the biomedical industry

Mythology
 Cancer (astrology), a sign in the zodiac
 Cancer (Chinese astronomy)

Science
 Cancer (constellation), a stellar constellation
 Crab Nebula, the supernova remnant found in the constellation Taurus
 Crab Pulsar, the central star in the Crab Nebula
 Crab (unit), photometrical unit of X-ray astronomy
 CRAB, an abbreviation for the symptoms of multiple myeloma
 "Crabs", a colloquial term for Pediculosis pubis
 Crab louse (Pthirus pubis), a type of parasitic louse

Technology
 Crab (cipher), an encryption algorithm based on MD5
 Crab landing, a method of landing a fixed-wing aircraft in a crosswind

Geography
 Crab, Virginia, an unincorporated community
 Crab Brook, a tributary of Stony Brook in central New Jersey
 Crab Creek, in the U.S. state of Washington
 Crab Creek (Little River), in North and South Carolina
 Crab Run (Mahanoy Creek), Pennsylvania
 Crab Run (West Virginia), a stream
 Crab Island (disambiguation)
 Crab Cay, Colombia, a small island in the Caribbean Sea

Music
 Crab canon, a musical form
 Crab Records, a defunct record label
 Crab (scratch), a DJ technique

Songs
 "Crab", a song by Weezer from Weezer (Green Album)

Sports
 Crab (horse) (1722–1750), a British Thoroughbred racehorse
 Basket Rimini Crabs, an Italian professional basketball team based in Rimini, Emilia-Romagna
 Crab (posture) used in gymnastics, breakdancing, yoga
 Crab or catch a crab, a rowing error

Other uses
 Sherman Crab, a British World War II mine-clearing tank
 Panhard CRAB, a French armoured combat vehicle
 The Crab, an outdoor 1962 painted steel sculpture by Alexander Calder
 Roger Crab (1621–1680), English soldier, haberdasher, herbal doctor and writer 
 An athletic move akin to the float in breakdancing
 Crabs, a slang phrase for the parasite Pediculosis pubis
 Crab, a character from WordWorld

See also
 Crab apples, species of the genus Malus other than the table apple Malus domestica
 
 Krab (disambiguation)

Animal common name disambiguation pages